Andre Begemann and Florin Mergea were the defending champions but only Begemann chose to defend his title, partnering Albano Olivetti. Begemann lost in the first round to Jesper de Jong and Bart Stevens.

Szymon Walków and Jan Zieliński won the title after defeating Dustin Brown and Robin Haase 6–3, 6–1 in the final.

Seeds

Draw

References

External links
 Main draw

Meerbusch Challenger - Doubles
2021 Doubles